Volán FC was a Hungarian football team from the Rákospalota neighborhood of Budapest, named after one of the main bus companies in the country Borsod Volán. It played six seasons in the first division of the Hungarian League, the Nemzeti Bajnokság I., mostly during the 1980s, when it was relegated four times and never finished higher than 11th place as in the first season. After the last relegation in 1991, the club folded.

The de facto successor to Volán is Rákospalotai EAC (REAC), which was formed from some elements of the former team. Although it took over Volán's league spot, it does not carry any of Volán's records. It sees itself as modern incarnation of the Read, which was formed in the early-20th century and was dissolved during World War II.

NB I. Results

Defunct football clubs in Hungary
1991 disestablishments in Hungary
Football clubs in Budapest